Tork or Torks may refer to:

People with the surname Tork
 Dave Tork (born 1934), American pole vaulter
 Hanan Tork (born 1975), Egyptian actress and ballerina
 Peter Tork (1942–2019), American musician and actor, best known as a member of The Monkees

Places

Iran
 Tork Amir, a village in Lorestan Province
 Tark, East Azerbaijan, a city in East Azerbaijan Province
 Tark, Ardabil, a village in Ardabil Province

Other uses
 Tork Angegh, ancient Armenian masculine deity, also called Torq and Durq/Turq
 Tork: Prehistoric Punk, a 2005 platform video game for the Xbox
 Torkils (also Torks, Cyrillic: торки), Turkic tribe of the Middle Ages
 Tork, brand of away-from-home tissue products made by Essity

See also
 Torc, rigid piece of personal adornment made from twisted metal
 Torc (disambiguation)
 Torque, tendency of a force to rotate an object about an axis
 Torque (disambiguation)
 Tark (disambiguation)